Satara everetti is a moth of the family Erebidae. It is found in southern Sulawesi.

References

Moths described in 1910
Spilosomina